Muxima is a town and commune in the municipality of Quiçama, Luanda Province, Angola. The village, located by Kwanza river, was occupied in 1589 by the Portuguese who erected a church and a fortress  in 1599. Muxima means "heart" in Kimbundu. It is the site of a Marian shrine. The town is the home of the 16th century Portuguese Fortress of Muxima.

Church
The church Nossa Senhora da Conceição, more well known as Nossa Senhora da Muxima, was first established in colonial Portuguese Angola in 1599.

It is a popular pilgrimage destination in Angola, that can receive more than 1 million pilgrims annually.

It became a popular pilgrimage site after a suspected Marian apparition in 1833.

During a holy mass in October 2013, an act of vandalism caused some reparable damages.

References

Communes in Luanda Province
Populated places in Luanda Province